Immanuel Kant Baltic Federal University (IKBFU) formerly known as the Immanuel Kant Russian State University (Rossiyskiy gosudarstvennyy universitet imeni Immanuila Kanta), or in brief the Kant University (Universitet Kanta), is a public research university located in the enclave of Kaliningrad, Russia.

The university was formerly known as the University of Königsberg (1544-1946), As a result of World War II, Russia annexed the city of Königsberg from Prussia and renamed it Kaliningrad, therefore the establishment was renamed Kaliningrad State University (1946–2005), then from 2005 onwards the university was renamed Immanuel Kant Baltic Federal University in honor of Immanuel Kant, a German philosopher. The university claims to maintain the traditions of its German predecessor, the University of Königsberg.

In 2020, the university was ranked #1,000+ in the Times Higher Education World University Ranking (THE WUR), and in 2022 it was ranked #2,350 in the Webometrics Ranking Web of Universities.

History 
The former University of Königsberg was commonly known as the Albertina. It was East Prussia's sole university and was specially regarded for its mathematics and astronomy. The campus was severely damaged by British aerial bombing in August 1944 during World War II. The Albertina was closed after Königsberg was captured by the Red Army in 1945.

After the war, Königsberg was renamed Kaliningrad and the new Russophone Kaliningrad State Pedagogical Institute used the campus of the Albertina from 1948 to 1967, including the main Albertina building inaugurated in 1862. In 1967, the institute received the status of a university and became known as Kaliningrad State University. In 2005, during the celebrations of the 750th anniversary of the founding of Königsberg, President Vladimir Putin of Russia and Chancellor Gerhard Schröder of Germany announced that the university would be renamed Immanuel Kant Russian State University in honour of Immanuel Kant.

As of 2005, the university consisted of twelve faculties with courses ranging from Natural Sciences to the Humanities. It had approximately 12,800 students enrolled, both undergraduate and post-graduate, and 580 faculty staff. IKSUR's Kant Society was created to study Kantianism, or Kantian philosophy. The university is also interested in the historical connections between Königsberg and Russia as far back as the 16th century.

In 2010-2011 the university is undergoing an enlargement and rebranding process which will lead to changing its name from Immanuel Kant State University of Russia to Immanuel Kant Baltic Federal University.

Education and training
The Immanuel Kant Baltic Federal University of today is an educational, scientific, cultural and enlightenment centre of the westernmost region of Russia.
 The university implements more than 300 educational programmes in the fields of secondary, vocational and higher education as well as continuing and post-university education.
 The university employs 900 teaching staff.
 The total number of students and doctoral students exceeds 14,000.
 List of the IKBFU educational programmes participating in the "Best educational programme of innovative Russia" project, which is being carried out by the Guild of professional education experts, the National centre of public accreditation and the editorial board of the Akkreditathsiya v obrazovanii magazine:
Social and cultural services and tourism; Law; Services; Interpreting and translation studies; Applied mathematics and informatics; Marketing; Mathematical maintenance and administration of information systems; Tourism; Mathematics; Philosophy; Journalism; Transport management and logistics.

Percentage of students according to the major fields of study
 Humanities 37.2%
 Economics and Management 12.4%
 Services 10.7%
 Natural Sciences 10.4%
 Physical and Mathematical Sciences 8.2%
 Transport 5.8%
 Education and Pedagogy 4.4%
 Healthcare 4.0%
 Information Security 2.8%
 Electronic and Radio Engineering and Communications 1.6%
 Social Sciences 1.5%
 Culture and Arts 1.0%

Ranking

In 2020, the university was ranked #1,000+ in the Times Higher Education World University Ranking (THE WUR), and in 2022 it was ranked #2,350 in the Webometrics Ranking Web of Universities.

Innovation
A science park was set up at the university in 2008. The major task of the park is the concentration of research potential. The IKBFU innovation park implements the Presidential programme for training managerial staff for national enterprises.

Notable people
Immanuel Kant

International cooperation
The level of international cooperation places IKBFU amongst the top ten higher educational institutions of Russia. The aim of the International Office is managing and coordinating international activities of the university as a whole, its students and Ph.D. candidates, teachers and staff members.

See also

Koenigsberg Observatory
Political philosophy of Immanuel Kant
Rechtsstaat
Rule according to higher law

References

External links 

 
 Official website in English (Archive)
  

 
Educational institutions established in 1948
Buildings and structures in Kaliningrad
Universities in Kaliningrad Oblast
1948 establishments in the Soviet Union
Federal universities of Russia
University of Königsberg